Zavyalov Island (or Ostrov Zav’yalova), formerly Ola Island (Остров Ольский), is a relatively large island in the Sea of Okhotsk, northwestern Pacific.

The Siberian dwarf pine (Pinus pumila) and the dwarf birch Betula middendorffii grow on the island. Its shores are a breeding ground for the Steller sea lion.

Administratively Zavyalov Island belongs to the Magadan Oblast of the Russian Federation.

History

Zavyalov Island was frequented by American whaleships cruising for bowhead whales between 1849 and 1885. They called it Bowhead Island. Whaleboats spent the night camping on the island to search for whales the following morning. They also obtained wood from the island and caught fish offshore.

References

 Islands in the Sea of Okhotsk

External links
 Magadan Oblast

Islands of the Sea of Okhotsk
Islands of the Russian Far East
Islands of Magadan Oblast